Acaphylla is a genus of mites belonging to the family Eriophyidae.

The species of this genus are found in Northern America.

Species:

Acaphylla acromia 
Acaphylla steinwedeni 
Acaphylla theae 
Acaphylla theavagrans

References

Eriophyidae